Sanctuary is the eighth studio album by American rock band The J. Geils Band. The album was released in November 1978 and is the first released by EMI Records.

Cash Box said that the single "Take It Back" is "good-time rock 'n' roll" with "a swinging handclap beat, pithy piano fills, [and] Magic Dick harmonica licks." Record World praised the organ and harmonica playing.

A 1998 re-release on the Razor & Tie label added two bonus tracks, taken from the 1982 live album Showtime!.

Track listing
All songs written by Seth Justman and Peter Wolf, except where noted.

Personnel
Peter Wolf – vocals
J. Geils – guitar
Magic Dick – harmonica
Seth Justman – keyboards, vocals
Danny Klein – bass
Stephen Jo Bladd – drums, vocals

Production
Producers: Seth Justman, Joseph Wissert
Engineer: David Brown, David Hewitt, Jon Mathias, Kooster McAllister, Frank Pavlich, David Thoener
Assistant engineers: Jesse Henderson, Jon Mathias
Mixing: David Thoener
Mastering: Joe Brescio, Elliot Federman
Project director: Mike Ragogna
Production coordination: David Richman
Arranger: Seth Justman
Layout design: Paula Bisacca
Photography: Alen MacWeeney, Rob Van Petten
Liner notes: John Tobler

Charts
Album

Singles

References

1978 albums
The J. Geils Band albums
Albums produced by Joe Wissert
Albums produced by Seth Justman
EMI Records albums